Seanad Éireann ("Senate of Ireland") is the upper house of the Oireachtas (the Irish legislature), which also comprises the President of Ireland and Dáil Éireann (the lower house).

It is commonly called the Seanad or Senate and its members senators (seanadóirí in Irish, singular: seanadóir). Unlike Dáil Éireann, it is not directly elected but consists of a mixture of members chosen by various methods. Its powers are much weaker than those of the Dáil and it can only delay laws with which it disagrees, rather than veto them outright. It can introduce new legislation. It has been located, since its establishment, in Leinster House.

Composition

Under Article 18 of the Constitution, Seanad Éireann consists of 60 senators, composed as follows:
 Eleven nominated by the Taoiseach.
 Six elected by the graduates of certain Irish universities:
 Three by graduates of the University of Dublin.
 Three by graduates of the National University of Ireland.
 Forty-three elected from five special panels of nominees (known as vocational panels) by an electorate consisting of TDs (members of Dáil Éireann), outgoing senators and members of city and county councils. Nomination is restrictive for the panel seats with only Oireachtas members and designated nominating bodies entitled to nominate. Each of the five panels consists, in theory, of individuals possessing special knowledge of, or experience in, one of five specific fields. In practice the nominees are party members, often, though not always, failed or aspiring Dáil candidates:
 Seven seats on the Administrative Panel: Public administration and social services (including the voluntary sector).
 Eleven seats on the Agricultural Panel: Agriculture and the fisheries.
 Five seats on the Cultural and Educational Panel: Education, the arts, the Irish language and Irish culture and literature.
 Nine seats on the Industrial and Commercial Panel: Industry and commerce (including engineering and architecture).
 Eleven seats on the Labour Panel: Labour (organised or otherwise).

The general election for the Seanad must occur not later than 90 days after the dissolution of Dáil Éireann. The election occurs under the system of proportional representation by means of the single transferable vote (in the panel constituencies each vote counts as 1000, allowing fractions of votes to be more easily transferred). Membership is open to all Irish citizens over 21, but a senator cannot also be a member of Dáil Éireann. However, as stated above, nomination to vocational panel seats is restricted; nomination in the university constituencies requires signatures of 10 graduates.

In the case of vacancies in the vocational panels, the electorate in the by-election consists of Oireachtas members only. Vacancies to the university seats are filled by the full electorate in that constituency.

Members of the 26th Seanad (2020–)

Powers
The powers of Seanad Éireann are modelled loosely on those of the British House of Lords. It is intended to play an advisory and revising role rather than to be an equal of the popularly elected Dáil. While notionally every Act of the Oireachtas must receive assent of both chambers, the Seanad can only delay rather than veto decisions of the Dáil. In practice, however, the Seanad has an in-built government majority due to the Taoiseach's nominees. The constitution imposes the following specific limitations on the powers of the Seanad:

 If a bill approved by Dáil Éireann has not received the assent of the Seanad within 90 days, then the Dáil may, within a further 180 days, resolve that the measure is "deemed" to have been approved by the Seanad. This has only occurred twice since 1937, once in 1959 when the Seanad rejected the Third Amendment to the Constitution Bill 1958 (the amendment proposed by this bill was, in the event, rejected in the subsequent referendum) and again in 1964 when they rejected the Pawnbrokers Bill 1964. In both instances the Dáil passed the requisite motion deeming the legislation to have been passed. 
 A money bill, such as the budget, may be deemed to have been approved by the Seanad after 21 days.
 In the case of an urgent bill, the time that must have expired before it can be deemed to have been approved by the Seanad may be abridged by the Government (cabinet) with the concurrence of the President (this does not apply to bills to amend the constitution).
 The fact that 11 senators are appointed by the Taoiseach usually ensures that the Government, which must have the support of the Dáil, also enjoys a plurality in the Seanad.

The Constitution does, however, grant to the Seanad certain means by which it may defend its prerogatives against an overly zealous Dáil:

 The Seanad may, by a resolution, ask the President to appoint a Committee of Privileges to adjudicate as to whether or not a particular bill is a money bill. The President may, however, refuse this request. This procedure has not been initiated since the re-establishment of the Seanad under the current Constitution in 1937.
 If a majority of senators and at least one-third of the members of the Dáil present a petition to the President stating that a bill is of great "national importance" the President can decline to sign the bill until it has been 'referred to the people'. This means that he or she can refuse to sign it until it has been approved either in an ordinary referendum or by the Dáil after it has reassembled after a general election.

Activities
Seanad Éireann adopts its own standing orders and appoints its president, known as the Cathaoirleach ("Chair"). The Taoiseach appoints a senator to be Leader of the House and direct government business there. The Seanad establishes its own standing committees and select committee; senators also participate, along with TDs (members of the Dáil) in joint committees of the Oireachtas. A maximum of two senators may be ministers in the Government.

Standing committees
 Committee on Administration
 Committee on Consolidation Bills
 Committee of Selection
 Committee on Procedure and Privileges
 Sub-committee on Compellability
 Committee on Members' Interests of Seanad Éireann

Select committees
 Select committee on Communications, Natural Resources and Agriculture
 Select committee on Environment, Transport, Culture and the Gaeltacht
 Select committee on European Union Affairs
 Select committee on Foreign Affairs and Trade
 Select committee on Finance, Public Expenditure and Reform
 Select committee on Health and Children
 Select committee on the Implementation of the Good Friday Agreement
 Select committee on Investigations, Oversight and Petitions
 Select committee on Jobs, Social Protection and Education
 Select committee on Justice, Defence and Equality

Historical origins

Precursors
The first parliamentary upper house in Ireland was the House of Lords of the Parliament of Ireland. Like its British counterpart, this house consisted of hereditary nobles and bishops. After the abolition of the Irish Parliament under the Act of Union of 1800 no parliament existed in Ireland until the twentieth century.

In 1919 Irish nationalists established a legislature called Dáil Éireann but this body was unicameral and so had no upper house. In 1920 the Parliament of Southern Ireland was established by British law with an upper house called the Senate. The Senate of Southern Ireland consisted of a mixture of Irish peers and government appointees. The Senate convened in 1921 but was boycotted by Irish nationalists and so never became fully operational. It was formally abolished with the establishment of the Irish Free State in 1922 but a number of its members were soon appointed to the new Free State senate.

Free State Seanad Éireann (1922–1936)

The name Seanad Éireann was first used as the title of the upper house of the Oireachtas of the Irish Free State. The first Seanad consisted of a mixture of members appointed by the President of the Executive Council and members indirectly elected by the Dáil, and W. T. Cosgrave agreed to use his appointments to grant extra representation to the state's Protestant minority. The procedures for election of senators were amended before the first Seanad election by the Constitution (Amendment No. 1) Act 1925.  It was intended that eventually the entire membership of the Seanad would be directly elected by the public but after only one election, in 1925, this system was abandoned in favour of a form of indirect election. Initially casual vacancies in the Seanad were filled by vote of the remaining members.  However this system was replaced under the Constitution (Amendment No. 11) Act 1929 by filling of vacancies by vote of both Dáil and Seanad, the system that continues today for panel members.  The Free State Seanad was abolished entirely in 1936 after it delayed some Government proposals for constitutional changes.

Constitution of Ireland (since 1937)
The modern Seanad Éireann was established by the Constitution of Ireland in 1937, and first sat on 25 January 1939. When this document was adopted it was decided to preserve the titles of Oireachtas, for the two houses of the legislature, in conjunction with the President, Dáil Éireann for the lower house, and Seanad Éireann for the upper house, the latter having been used during the Irish Free State. This new Seanad was considered to be the direct successor of the Free State Seanad and so the first Seanad convened under the new constitution was referred to as the "Second Seanad".

The new system of vocational panels used to nominate candidates for the Seanad was inspired by the corporatist Roman Catholic social teaching of the 1930s, and in particular the 1931 papal encyclical Quadragesimo anno. In this document Pope Pius XI argued that the Marxist concept of class conflict should be replaced with a vision of social order based on the co-operation and interdependence of society's various vocational groups.

Calls for reform
Since 1928, twelve separate official reports have been published on reform of the Seanad. In the past the Progressive Democrats called for its abolition; however, in government, members of the party were nominated to the Seanad by the Taoiseach. The post-1937 body has been criticised on a number of grounds, including claims that it is weak and dominated by the Government of the day. There are also allegations of patronage in the selection of its members, with senators often being close allies of the Taoiseach or candidates who have failed to be elected to the Dáil. Many senators have subsequently been elected as TDs.

Irish universities have a long tradition of electing independent candidates. Some, like the pressure group Graduate Equality, argue that the franchise for electing university senators should be extended to the graduates of all third level institutions. Others believe that this does not go far enough and that at least some portion of the Seanad should be directly elected by all adult citizens. Calls have also been made for the Seanad to be used to represent Irish emigrants or the people of Northern Ireland. In 1999 the Reform Movement called for some of the Taoiseach's nominations to be reserved for members of the Irish-British minority, and other minorities such as members of the Travelling Community and recently arrived immigrants. The Seventh Amendment in 1979 altered the provisions of Article 18.4 to allow for a redistribution of the university seats to any other institutes of higher education in the state, although no change has in fact taken place since then.

In 2019, a University of Limerick graduate issued a High Court challenge to the limitation of voting rights to graduates of National University of Ireland, University of Dublin, and Oireachtas and local authority members. The case was heard by a three-judge division of the High Court in 2021. The challenge was rejected by the court later that year however the plaintiff in the case confirmed he would appeal the High Court's ruling. In June 2022, the Supreme Court confirmed it would hear the appeal directly rather than the appeal first going to the Court of Appeal.

Referendum on abolition

In October 2009, Fine Gael leader Enda Kenny stated his intention that a Fine Gael government would abolish the Seanad, and along with reducing the number of TDs by 20, it would "save an estimated €150m over the term of a Dáil." During the 2011 election campaign, Labour, Sinn Féin and the Socialist Party also supported abolition of the Seanad, while Fianna Fáil supported a referendum on the issue. The programme of the Fine Gael–Labour coalition, which came to power at the election, sought to abolish the Seanad as part of a broader programme of constitutional reform, but lost a referendum on the matter in October 2013 by 51.7% to 48.3%.

Members from Northern Ireland

Taoisigh have often included people from Northern Ireland among their eleven nominees, such as John Robb (served 1982–89), Seamus Mallon (1982–83) of the SDLP, Bríd Rodgers (1983–87) also of the SDLP, peace campaigner Gordon Wilson (1993–97), businessman Edward Haughey (1994–2002), Maurice Hayes (1997–2002), and Emer Currie (2020–present).

Sam McAughtry was elected to the Industrial and Commercial Panel in a by-election in February 1996. Niall Ó Donnghaile was elected in April 2016 as a Sinn Féin senator for the Administrative Panel while serving on Belfast City Council. Ian Marshall, a farmer and activist from a Unionist background, was elected to the Agricultural Panel in a by-election in April 2018.

Notable former senators

 Noël Browne
 Robert Malachy Burke
 Éamon de Buitléar
 James Dooge
 Garret FitzGerald
 Brian Friel
 Valerie Goulding
 Edward Haughey, Baron Ballyedmond
 Maurice Hayes
 Michael D. Higgins
 Tras Honan
 Douglas Hyde
 Benjamin Guinness, 3rd Earl of Iveagh
 Cecil Lavery
 Edward Pakenham, 6th Earl of Longford
 Sam McAughtry
 Peadar Toner Mac Fhionnlaoich
 Catherine McGuinness
 John Magnier
 Seamus Mallon
 P. J. Mara
 Maurice George Moore
 Conor Cruise O'Brien
 Mary Robinson
 Bríd Rodgers
 James Ryan
 Owen Sheehy-Skeffington
 T. K. Whitaker
 Gordon Wilson

See also
 Bicameralism
 Politics of the Republic of Ireland
 Records of members of the Oireachtas
 Senate
 Senate of Northern Ireland
 University constituency
Senedd Cymru – Welsh Parliament

References

External links
Report on Reform of the Seanad  – Report of Seanad Éireann Committee on Procedure and Privileges Sub-Committee on Seanad Reform, from official Oireachtas website.

 
1937 establishments in Ireland
Ireland
Oireachtas